Andrew J. Welch III (born March 3, 1972) is an American politician from Georgia. Welch is a former Republican member of the Georgia House of Representatives from the 110th district since 2011.

References

1972 births
Living people
Republican Party members of the Georgia House of Representatives
21st-century American politicians